Cammock's Hotel, at 28 N. Main St. in Lodge Grass, Montana, dates from 1920.  Also known as the Old REA Building, it was listed on the National Register of Historic Places in 1987.

It is a two-story brick building which was built by Edward Cammocks in 1920.  It later served the Rural Electric Association.

References

		
National Register of Historic Places in Big Horn County, Montana
Hotel buildings completed in 1920
1920 establishments in Montana
Hotel buildings on the National Register of Historic Places in Montana